Jonathan David Gallardo (born 28 February 1997) is an Argentine professional footballer who plays as a midfielder for Sarmiento.

Career
Gallardo started his career with Sportivo Las Parejas. He began featuring for their first-team at the age of sixteen, featuring five times in Torneo Argentino B campaigns in 2013 and 2014. In January 2014, Gallardo had trials in Chilean football. His parent club won promotion in the following 2015 campaign, though Gallardo didn't play for them as he spent the year out on loan in Primera División side Unión Santa Fe's youth. Seven goals, including two against Gimnasia y Esgrima, in sixty-four fixtures back with Sportivo Las Parejas in all competitions subsequently came in the 2016, 2016–17 and 2017–18 tier three seasons.

Ahead of 2018–19, Gallardo completed a loan move to Primera B Nacional's Villa Dálmine; penning a season-long deal in May 2018. His bow for Villa Dálmine arrived on 28 July in the Copa Argentina against River Plate, which preceded his league debut in September versus Chacarita Juniors. He remained for the 2019–20 campaign, where he took his overall tally for the club to twenty-six games. He returned to Sportivo Las Parejas on 30 June 2020. 

After loan spells at Tigre and Ferro Carril Oeste, Gallardo finally left Sportivo Las Parejas to join newly promoted Argentine Primera División club Sarmiento in January 2022 on a deal until the end of 2025.

Career statistics
.

References

External links

1997 births
Living people
People from Iriondo Department
Argentine footballers
Association football midfielders
Torneo Federal A players
Primera Nacional players
Argentine Primera División players
Sportivo Las Parejas footballers
Unión de Santa Fe footballers
Villa Dálmine footballers
Club Atlético Tigre footballers
Ferro Carril Oeste footballers
Club Atlético Sarmiento footballers
Sportspeople from Santa Fe Province